Wind power constitutes a small but growing proportion of New Zealand's electricity. As of December 2020, wind power accounts for 690 MW of installed capacity and over 5 percent of electricity generated in the country.

New Zealand has abundant wind resources. 
The country is in the path of the Roaring Forties, strong and constant westerly winds, and the funneling effect of Cook Strait and the Manawatu Gorge increase the resource's potential. Over three-quarters (512 MW) of the country's wind generation is installed within a  radius of Palmerston North, with some turbines in the area having a capacity factor of over 50 percent.

Generation capacity and expansion

As of December 2020, New Zealand had an installed wind generation capacity of 690 MW. In the 2020 calendar year, wind power produced 2,282 GWh of electricity, 5.5 percent of the country's electricity generation that year.

A further 2,500 MW of wind farms have received resource consent.

The New Zealand Wind Energy Association predicts that wind could reach 20 percent of New Zealand's annual generation by 2035.

Wind potential 

New Zealand has outstanding wind resources, due to its position astride the Roaring Forties, resulting in nearly continuous strong westerly winds over many locations, unimpeded by other nearby landmasses at similar latitude. One study found that using 1% of total available land for wind farms would produce approximately 100,000 gigawatt hours (GWh) per year. This is roughly two times the annual electricity consumption of New Zealand.  Nearly continuous, however, does not mean continuous: high-pressure weather systems, for instance, sometimes cover the entire country, resulting in no significant winds anywhere, and dispatchable sources like hydro and gas must take over.

The strength and consistency of New Zealand winds means the nationwide capacity factor is high compared to other countries, averaging between 30 and 35 percent, with some individual turbines recording capacity factors above 50 percent.

Public opinion

Wind farms and turbines generate a wide range of opinions from outright opposition to widespread acceptance. Opposition is due to noise, aesthetics and ecological factors.

Coping with intermittency

Wind farms partner well with hydro plants on the same grid to create combined power plants, because hydro plants can be uprated with extra turbine units to provide highly dispatchable peak generating capacity above the average flows of their rivers, at lower cost than other peak power options. During periods of high wind and low electricity demand, a hydro plant can reduce its output to accumulate water in its reservoir, whilst wind power handles a higher share of the grid load. Then during periods of low wind, the hydro plant can raise its output temporarily, drawing down its reservoir a bit. Given New Zealand's large proportion of hydroelectric generating capacity, it is better-positioned than most nations to uprate its generating stations and grid to handle intermittent power sources such as wind and solar. The available virtual energy storage represented by hydro plants can be one of the main factors limiting the maximum amount of wind and solar power that a grid can accommodate. Further increases in intermittent power source development may require construction of pumped-storage hydroelectricity and implementation of energy demand management techniques.

List of operating wind farms 
Only wind turbines and farms over 5 MW generating capacity are listed.
Individual demonstration and prototype wind turbines have been installed at Southbridge in Canterbury, Gebbies Pass near Christchurch and Brooklyn in Wellington.
Many small windmills serve as windpumps on New Zealand farms.

Meridian Energy also operates a 1 MW wind farm on Ross Island, Antarctica. It is not included in the above list as it does not contribute electricity to the New Zealand national electricity network.

Proposed and under construction

Abandoned

See also 

 Energy in New Zealand
 Renewable energy commercialization
 Solar power in New Zealand
 Ocean power in New Zealand
 Geothermal power in New Zealand
 Biofuel in New Zealand
 Hydroelectric power in New Zealand
 Solar hot water in New Zealand
 Electricity sector in New Zealand
List of power stations in New Zealand
Renewable energy in New Zealand
Renewable energy by country

References

External links

New Zealand Wind Energy Association